The United States–Bahrain Free Trade Agreement (USBFTA) is a free trade agreement (FTA) between the United States and Bahrain, signed on September 14, 2004. It was ratified by the United States House of Representatives on December 7, 2005, by 327–95, with 10 not voting.

The United States Senate approved the bill on December 13, 2005, by voice vote. President George W. Bush signed the USBFTA Implementation Act into law on January 11, 2006. The FTA was implemented on August 1, 2006, and will reduce certain barriers of trade between the two countries.

Early stages of the Bahrain–U.S. free trade negotiations go back to the year 1999, with the signing of a Bilateral Investment Treaty (BIT), which entered into force May 31, 2001. It is the first such treaty signed between the United States and a member of the GCC, and is aimed at stimulating the flow of private investment between the two countries. Both parties agreed that a stable framework for investment would maximize effective utilization of economic resources and improve living standards. One year later, a Trade and Investment Framework Agreement (TIFA) was signed on June 18, 2002, representing the prelude for the FTA negotiations. The TIFA was designed as a forum for an ongoing bilateral dialogue on economic reform and trade liberalization.

See more
 Rules of Origin
 Market access
 Free-trade area
 Tariffs

References

External links
 Final text of the U.S.–Bahrain Free Trade Agreement, Office of the United States Trade Representative
 H.R. 4340 on GovTrack.us
 Bush's Presidential Proclamation on the Implementation of the USFTA
 "U.S.–Bahrain Free Trade Agreement: Potential Economywide and Selected Sectoral Effects", U.S. International Trade Commission, October 2004
 Congressional Research Service Report on Bahrain FTA
 Citizens' Trade Campaign Site on Bahrain FTA
 U.S. Senate Finance Committee Hearing on Bahrain FTA
 U.S. House Ways and Means Committee Hearing on Bahrain FTA
 Testimony on Bahrain FTA of David Hamod, National U.S.-Arab Chamber of Commerce

Free trade agreements of the United States
Economy of Bahrain
Treaties concluded in 2004
Treaties of Bahrain
Treaties entered into force in 2006
2004 in Bahrain
Acts of the 109th United States Congress
Bahrain–United States relations
Presidency of George W. Bush